Dionisio Mejía Vieyra  (6 January 1907 – 17 July 1963) was a Mexican football forward who made one appearance for the Mexico at the 1930 FIFA World Cup. He was also part of Mexico's squad for the 1928 Summer Olympics, but he did not play in any matches.

International career

International goals
Scores and results list Mexico's goal tally first.

References

External links

1907 births
1963 deaths
Mexican footballers
Mexico international footballers
1930 FIFA World Cup players
Association football forwards
Footballers at the 1928 Summer Olympics
Olympic footballers of Mexico